Hypercompe anomala is a moth of the family Erebidae first described by Hermann Burmeister in 1883. It is found in Argentina.

References

anomala
Moths described in 1883